Peggy Anne Gibson (born February 22, 1949 in Huron, South Dakota) is an American politician and a Democratic former member of the South Dakota House of Representatives representing District 22 from 2009 until 2017.

Education
Gibson attended Arizona State University and earned her BA degrees in history and Spanish from Northern Montana College (now Montana State University–Northern).

Elections
2012 With incumbent Republican Representative Jim White running for South Dakota Senate and leaving a House District 22 seat open, Gibson ran in the three-way June 5, 2012 Democratic Primary and placed first with 1,058 votes (46.3%); in the four-way November 6, 2012 General election, Gibson took the first seat with 5,299 votes (30.6%) and Republican nominee Dick Werner took the second seat ahead of Democratic nominee Dale Hargens and Republican nominee Jay Slater.
2006 To challenge Senate District 22 incumbent Republican Senator Tom Hansen, Gibson was unopposed for the June 6, 2006 Democratic Primary after another challenger withdrew, but lost the November 7, 2006 General election to Senator Hansen.
2008 When House District 22 incumbent Democratic Representative Dale Hargens ran for South Dakota Senate and left a District 22 seat open, Gibson ran in the three-way June 3, 2008 Democratic Primary and placed second with 2,145 votes (38.57%) ahead of former state Senator Ron J. Volesky; in the four-way November 4, 2008 General election incumbent Democratic Representative Quinten Burg took the first seat and Gibson took the second seat with 4,939 votes (27.53%) ahead of Republican nominees Joshua Haeder (who had run for the seat in 2006) and Cliff Hadley.
2010 Gibson and incumbent Representative Burg were unopposed for the June 8, 2010 Democratic Primary but in the three-way November 2, 2010 General election, Gibson took the first seat with 4,856 votes (34.71%) and Republican nominee Jim White took the second seat ahead of Representative Burg; an election recount did not change the result.

References

External links
Official page at the South Dakota Legislature
Campaign site
 

1949 births
Living people
Arizona State University alumni
Democratic Party members of the South Dakota House of Representatives
Montana State University–Northern alumni
People from Huron, South Dakota
Women state legislators in South Dakota
21st-century American politicians
21st-century American women politicians